Omar Navarro (born 1989) is as a perennial candidate in California's 43rd congressional district.

Omar Navarro may also refer to:
 Gran Omar or Omar Jose Navarro, Puerto Rican reggaeton musician
 Omar Navarro, a recurring character on Ozark